

2013

See also
2013 in Turkey

Turkey
2013
2013 in Turkish cinema